Eugennaea is a genus of moths belonging to the family Tineidae. It was described in 1914 by Edward Meyrick. The genus contains only one species, Eugennaea laquearia, which is endemic to New Zealand. Meyrick described the species from specimens collected by George Vernon Hudson on Nikau stems at Kaeo in January.

Description of species

The wingspan is about 11 mm. The forewings are elongate and dark purple-fuscous, with light-blue reflections. The hindwings are dark fuscous with bronzy reflections.

References

Tineidae
Monotypic moth genera
Moths of New Zealand
Endemic fauna of New Zealand
Taxa named by Edward Meyrick
Tineidae genera
Endemic moths of New Zealand